Avicularin is a bio-active flavonol isolated from a number of plants including Polygonum aviculare, Rhododendron aureum and Taxillus kaempferi.

It suppresses lipid accumulation through repression of C/EBPα-activated GLUT4-mediated glucose uptake in 3T3-L1 cells.

References 

Flavonol glycosides
Arabinosides
Hydroxymethyl compounds